Donna Schaenzer Kramer is a retired American artistic gymnast. She won a gold, a silver and a bronze medal at the 1967 Pan American Games, and a silver at the 1966 Trampoline World Championships. She held the national all-around title in 1963 and 1966. Between 1979 and 1985 she worked as gymnastics coach at Iowa State University.

References

Year of birth missing (living people)
Living people
American female artistic gymnasts
Pan American Games medalists in gymnastics
Pan American Games silver medalists for the United States
Pan American Games bronze medalists for the United States
Gymnasts at the 1967 Pan American Games
Medalists at the 1967 Pan American Games
21st-century American women